The 2017 Major League Soccer season was the 22nd season of Major League Soccer, top division of soccer in the United States and Canada. The regular season began on March 3, 2017 and concluded on October 22, 2017. The MLS Cup Playoffs began on October 25, 2017 and concluded with MLS Cup 2017 on December 9, 2017.

Two new clubs joined the league as expansion franchises: Atlanta United FC and Minnesota United FC. The two franchises were the 21st and 22nd teams in the league.

Seattle Sounders FC were the defending MLS Cup champions, while FC Dallas were the defending Supporters' Shield champions. Toronto FC became the first Canadian team to win the Cup and Shield. Toronto's win of the Canadian Championship in the same year earned them the first domestic treble by an MLS side.

Teams

Stadiums and locations

Personnel and sponsorship

Note: All teams use Adidas as kit manufacturer.

Coaching changes

Regular season

Format
Current teams: Each team in the league (except for expansion teams Atlanta United FC and Minnesota United FC) played 17 home and 17 away games (for a total of 34 games) using the following format:
 2 games (home and away) against 10 teams in its conference (20 games).
 1 extra game against 3 of its conference rivals (3 games).
 1 game against 11 teams in the other conference (11 games).
Expansion teams: As expansion teams to the league in 2017, Atlanta United and Minnesota United played 17 home and 17 away games (for a total of 34 games) in a secondary format:
 2 games (home and away) against 10 teams in its conference (20 games).
 1 extra game against 2 of its conference rivals (2 games).
 1 game against 10 teams in the other conference (10 games).
 2 games (1 home and 1 away) against each other (2 games).

Conference standings

Eastern Conference

Western Conference

Overall table

MLS Cup Playoffs

Bracket

Knockout round

Conference semifinals

Conference finals

MLS Cup

Attendance

Average home attendances
Ranked from highest to lowest average attendance.

 game played at East Hartford

Highest attendances 
Regular season

Player statistics

Goals

Assists

Shutouts

Hat-tricks 

4 Scored 4 goals

Awards

Player of the Month

Player and Team of the week
 Bold denotes player of the week.

Goal of the Week

End-of-season awards

MLS Best XI

Player contracts

Highest-paid players

Allocation ranking

The allocation ranking is the mechanism used to determine which MLS club has first priority to acquire a player who is in the MLS allocation list. The MLS allocation list contains select U.S. National Team players and players transferred outside of MLS garnering a transfer fee of at least $500,000. The allocations will be ranked in reverse order of finish for the 2016 season, taking playoff performance into account. Two expansion teams will take the top spots.

Once the club uses its allocation ranking to acquire a player, it drops to the bottom of the list. A ranking can be traded provided that part of the compensation received in return is another club's ranking. At all times each club is assigned one ranking. The rankings reset at the end of each MLS season.

Coaches

Eastern Conference 
 Atlanta United FC: Gerardo Martino
 Chicago Fire: Veljko Paunović
 Columbus Crew SC: Gregg Berhalter
 D.C. United: Ben Olsen
 Montreal Impact: Mauro Biello
 New England Revolution: Jay Heaps and Tom Soehn
 New York City FC: Patrick Vieira
 New York Red Bulls: Jesse Marsch
 Orlando City SC: Jason Kreis
 Philadelphia Union: Jim Curtin
 Toronto FC: Greg Vanney

Western Conference 
 Colorado Rapids: Pablo Mastroeni
 FC Dallas: Óscar Pareja
 Houston Dynamo: Wílmer Cabrera
 LA Galaxy: Curt Onalfo and Sigi Schmid
 Minnesota United FC: Adrian Heath
 Portland Timbers: Caleb Porter
 Real Salt Lake: Jeff Cassar and Mike Petke
 San Jose Earthquakes: Dominic Kinnear and Chris Leitch
 Seattle Sounders FC: Brian Schmetzer
 Sporting Kansas City: Peter Vermes
 Vancouver Whitecaps FC: Carl Robinson

References

External links
 

 
2017
1